Leucopogon elatior is a species of flowering plant in the heath family Ericaceae and is endemic to the south-west of Western Australia. It is a slender, erect or straggly shrub with broadly egg-shaped leaves, and white, tube-shaped flowers.

Description
The flowers are arranged in cylindrical spike of many flowers with leaf-like bracts and small bracteoles. Flowering occurs from January to May, or July to November.

Taxonomy and naming
Leucopogon elatior as was first formally described in 1845 by Otto Wilhelm Sonder in Johann Georg Christian Lehmann's Plantae Preissianae. The specific epithet (elatior) means "taller".

Distribution and habitat
This leucopogon grows on sandplains, hillslopes and winter-wet places in the south-west of Western Australia.

Conservation status
Leucopogon elatior is classified as "not threatened" by the Western Australian Government Department of Biodiversity, Conservation and Attractions.

References

elatior
Ericales of Australia
Flora of Western Australia
Plants described in 1845
Taxa named by Otto Wilhelm Sonder